Rover P2 may refer to any of the following automobiles produced by the Rover Company between 1937 and 1948:
 Rover 10
 Rover 12
 Rover 14
 Rover 16
 Rover 20

The P2 is the successor to P1, which was produced from 1933 to 1938. P2 is succeeded by Rover P3.

P2